Sardis is a census-designated place (CDP) in southeastern Lee Township, Monroe County, Ohio, United States.  It is unincorporated, but has a post office with the ZIP code of 43946. As of the 2010 census, it had a population of 559.

Sardis is at the intersection of Ohio State Routes 7 and 255, lying between Duffy and Fly.

Among the early settlers in this area was Major Earl Sproat, one of the 48 members of the Ohio Company. The Ohio Company founded Marietta, the first permanent settlement in the Northwest Territory in 1788. The village of Sardis was laid out by James Patton in 1843.

Students from Sardis attend River Elementary and River High School in nearby Hannibal, and are served by the Switzerland of Ohio Local School District. This school is shared with other nearby riverfront communities including: Antioch, Duffy, Fly, Hannibal, Laings, Powhatan Point (of neighboring Belmont County), and Clarington.

Geography

Demographics

References

Census-designated places in Monroe County, Ohio
Ohio populated places on the Ohio River